is a Japanese novelist best known for his light novel series High School DxD.

Career 
In 2005, Ishibumi received a special prize in the 17th Fantasia Awards hosted by Fujimi Shobo for the light novel Denpachi that he submitted. He made his debut with that novel when it was published in 2006 as a tankōbon. The same year, he published his second light novel Slash/Dog. Two years later, in 2008, he began publishing the light-novel series High School DxD, with 25 volumes published as well as an additional 4 volumes of a sequel series, Shin High School DxD. The series has been adapted into multiple manga and anime television series. While preparing the light novels, his father died.

Bibliography

Early works 
 Denpachi (2006)
 Slash/Dog (2006)
  (Revamped of original series, 2014)
  (2018)

High School DxD series 

  (2008)
  (2008)
  (2009)
  (2009)
  (2009)
  (2010)
  (2010)
  (2010)
  (2011)
  (2011)
  (2012)
  (2012)
  (2012)
  (2013)
  (2013)
  (2013)
  (2014)
  (2014)
  (2014)
  (2015)
  2016
  2016
  2017
  2017
  2018

To accommodate the growing number of short stories published, a series of light novels, the DX series, that acts as a compilation was created.
  (2015)
  (2015)
  (2016)
  (2017)

 (18 March 2013)

See also
 High School DxD characters
 High School DxD episodes
 High School DxD light novels

References 
Notes

External links 
 

1981 births
Japanese writers
Living people
Place of birth missing (living people)
Light novelists